Kayan Township or Khayan Township is a township of Yangon Region.

References

Townships of Yangon Region